Revolution Rise is the second studio album by the American hard rock supergroup Kill Devil Hill. It is the band's final album to feature drummer Vinny Appice and bassist Rex Brown due to their departures in March 2014 and January 2019, respectively.

Track listing

Personnel 
Jason Bragg – vocals
Rex Brown – bass
Vinny Appice – drums
Mark Zavon – guitars

Additional personnel 
Jay Ruston – mixing
Sam Shearon – artwork

References

External links
 Review on Allmusic

Kill Devil Hill (band) albums
2013 albums